John Hanks (February 9, 1802 – July 1, 1889) was Abraham Lincoln's first cousin, once removed, his mother's cousin. He was the son of William, Nancy Hanks Lincoln's uncle and grandson of Joseph Hanks.

Early years and marriage 
John Hanks was born near Beardstown, and near the Falls at Rough Creek, in Nelson County, Kentucky, on February 9, 1802. Four years later his family moved to Hardin County, Kentucky. Hanks married Susan Malinda Wilson in Kentucky in 1826. She was born on February 14, 1804, and died on March 11, 1863. Their children were William, Louis, Jane, Phelix, Emily, Mary Ellen and Levi.

Thomas Lincoln family
Hanks lived in Indiana with Thomas Lincoln for four years from 1822 or 1823. While there, he and Abraham farmed corn and were hired out to split rails. He then traveled to Kentucky for a year or two. In 1828 settled in Macon County, Illinois, after having built the first house in Decatur, Illinois.  It was he who persuaded Thomas to move to Illinois in 1830.

He worked alongside Abraham at his first job after he left home.  Hanks and Abraham together went to New Orleans in 1831, as hired hands on a flatboat owned by Denton Offutt, Lincoln (and his stepbrother John D. Johnston) being hired at Hanks' recommendation. Hanks claims that he initiated the first speech for Lincoln, believing that he would deliver a better speech than the candidate running for office. Having heard the speech, the candidate urged Lincoln to continue giving speeches.

Black Hawk war
Hanks served four or six months during the Black Hawk War of 1832, during which time he helped build a fort at Ottawa.

1860 Republican presidential campaign

Rail splitter campaign
It was Hanks who accompanied Richard J. Oglesby to the old Lincoln farm and brought back the split fence rails for Lincoln's famous "rail splitter" campaign at the Republican Party convention at Decatur, Illinois, in 1860.  

On May 9, 1860, the opening day of the convention, Oglesby addressed the crowd, announcing that "An old Democrat of Macon county […] desire[s] to make a contribution to the Convention".  At this cue, Hanks, and Isaac Jennings, carried two of the fence railings into the Convention hall, which were tagged with a banner that read "Abraham Lincoln, the Rail Candidate for President in 1860.  Two rails from a lot of three thousand made in 1830 by John Hanks and Abe Lincoln.".

This election stunt had the side-effect of making Hanks into somewhat of a national celebrity. Supporters requested "genuine Lincoln rails" split by Hanks and Lincoln.  Oglesby wrote certificates of authenticity of the 72 "genuine" Lincoln rails that were dispatched on Hanks' behalf.

Rumor
The Democrats started a rumour that Hanks was not in fact going to vote for Lincoln come election time.  They had come to that conclusion based upon his having voted for Stephen A. Douglas, the Democratic presidential hopeful, in 1858.  Oglesby transcribed a letter in response for the illiterate Hanks, stating that he would be voting for Lincoln and why. The letter was condemned by Hanks' brother Charles and the Democrats, who were suspicious that it was written by someone else, some "smart Republican", on Hanks' behalf. Charles stated that he thought Hanks "even yet does not know what is in it, much less did he ever write it". It was decided that no more open letters by Hanks should be published, and instead Hanks took to making personal appearances in support of Lincoln on the campaign trail.

Political appointment request
After Lincoln's election, Hanks sought a political appointment in the new administration, again through Oglesby as a letter-writing intermediary, preferring to be an Indian agent.  However, although (according to Henry Clay Whitney) Lincoln did give the matter some serious consideration, he was not appointed to any position by Lincoln, although he did visit the White House several times and attended Lincoln's inauguration.

Civil War
When the United States Civil War broke, Hanks enlisted as a teamster in the Illinois regiment, under Ulysses S. Grant, despite being technically too old to enlist.  Hanks was never to see his first cousin, once removed, in the flesh again, their paths only crossing for a final time when Hanks attended Lincoln's funeral.

See also
Lincoln family tree

Notes

References

Bibliography

Further reading 
 
 

19th-century American people
Abraham Lincoln
1802 births
1889 deaths
People from Macon County, Illinois